The Inter City Midweek Football League was one of several Scottish supplementary football leagues run in the 1912–13 season.

Because Wednesday was the only day that shopworkers in Scotland had off, it was decided to form a Midweek League for their benefit. Six top Scottish Football League clubs entered teams, but the competition was abandoned in November 1912 after only four rounds because of disappointing attendances.

Table

Results

References

Defunct football leagues in Scotland
1912 establishments in Scotland
Sports leagues established in 1912
Sports leagues disestablished in 1912
1912 disestablishments in Scotland

he:ליגות כדורגל מוספות#ליגת הכדורגל הבין-עירונית באמצע שבוע